Pelmo Park-Humberlea is a neighbourhood in Toronto, Ontario, Canada. It is located north-west of the central core, in the former suburb of North York. Many of the neighbourhoods in this quadrant of the city can aptly be described as family neighbourhoods with access to parks, green space and a slower pace than found closer to downtown.

As its name implies, it is composed of two geographic areas, the first being the Pelmo Park area which is bordered by the 401 to the north, Woodward Avenue to the south, Jane Street to the east and the CNR rail tracks to the west. The second area, Humberlea, is centred on Weston Road and bordered by Sheppard Avenue west to the north, Oak Street to the south, the CNR rail tracks to the east and the Humber River to the west.

Education
Two public school boards operate schools in Pelmo Park – Humberlea, the separate Toronto Catholic District School Board (TCDSB), and the secular Toronto District School Board (TDSB).

Both TCDSB, and TDSB operate public elementary schools in the neighbourhood. TCDSB operates St. Simon Catholic School, whereas TDSB operate Pelmo Park Public School. TCDSB is the only public school board to operate a secondary school in Pelmo Park – Humberlea, St. Basil-the-Great College School.

TDSB does not operate a secondary school in the neighbourhood, with TDSB secondary school students residing in Pelmo Park – Humberleaattending institutions in adjacent neighbourhoods. The French first language public secular school board, Conseil scolaire Viamonde, and its separate counterpart, Conseil scolaire catholique MonAvenir also offer schooling to applicable residents of Pelmo Park – Humberlea, although they do not operate a school in the neighbourhood. CSCM and CSV students attend schools situated in other neighbourhoods in Toronto.

Demographics
The population of Pelmo Park-Humberlea in 2016 was: 10,722
Major ethnic populations (2016):
 56.3% White; 26.6% Italian, 8.6% Portuguese
 11.2% Black; 5.2% Jamaican
 7.6% Latin American (of any race)
 6.6% South Asian
 4.5% Filipino
 3.8% East Indian

The population of Pelmo Park-Humberlea in 2011 was: 8,710

Major ethnic populations (2011):
 62.0% White; 34.0% Italian
 10.9% Black
 5.5% South Asian
 5.4% Latin American (of any race)
 4.9% East Indian
 2.6% Filipino

The population of Pelmo Park-Humberlea in 2001 was: 8,080

Major ethnic populations (2001):
 68.9% White; 41.3% Italian, 4.3% Portuguese
 8.4% Black
 3.8% South Asian
 2.5% Latin American (of any race)
 1.9% Filipino

Recreation

Several municipal parks are located in Pelmo Park – Humberlea including Crawford-Jones Memorial Park, Pelmo Park, Pine Point Park, Strathburn Park, and Wallace C. Swanek Park. A number of these parks are situated next to the Humber Valley, which forms a part of the larger Toronto ravine system. Municipal parks are managed by the Toronto Parks, Forestry and Recreation Division. In addition to municipal parks, the division also manages a community centre in the neighbourhood, Pelmo Park Community Centre.

Transportation
Several major roadways bound Pelmo Park – Humberlea. Sheppard Avenue bounds the neighbourhood to the north, whereas portions of Albion Road, and Weston Road bound the neighbourhood to the west. Highway 400 is a controlled access highway that bounds the neighbourhood to the east. Highway 401 is another east–west highway that bisects the neighbourhood, serving as a dividing line between Humberlea and Pelmo Park. Both highways provide access to other neighbourhoods in the city, the Greater Toronto Area, and southern Ontario.

Public transportation is provided by the Toronto Transit Commission (TTC). The TTC operates several bus routes throughout the neighbourhood.

See also

 List of neighbourhoods in Toronto

References

External links
 City of Toronto demographic profile for Pelmo Park-Humberlea
 http://www.torontoplaques.com/Pages_VWZ/Wallace_C_Swanek.html

 

Neighbourhoods in Toronto
North York